Fabrice Santoro and Nenad Zimonjić were the defending champions, but Simon Aspelin and Julian Knowle defeated them 6–4, 7–6(7–5), in the final.

Seeds

Draw

Draw

External links
Association of Tennis Professionals (ATP) draw

Doubles